Bernard Krainis (1924-2000) was an American musician and co-founder of New York Pro Musica. He played recorder and studied with Erich Katz.

Bernard Krainis, a noted recorder player and a founding member of the New York Pro Musica Antiqua and the Aston Magna Foundation for Music, two pioneering ensembles for the performance of early music on period instruments, died on Aug. 18, 2000 at his home in Great Barrington, Mass. He was 75.

The cause of death was cancer, his family said.

Mr. Krainis was born in New Brunswick, N.J., on Dec. 28, 1924, the son of Abraham and Rose Sachs Krainis. During World War II he served in the Army, stationed in India with the Seventh Bomber Group. He attended Denver University. But it was his studies at New York University, where he was a student of the medieval and Renaissance music scholar Gustave Reese, that determined the future course of his life.

In 1952, along with the conductor and musicologist Noah Greenberg, Mr. Krainis formed the New York Pro Musica Antiqua, which brought wider public attention to early music and was in the forefront of the period-instrument movement. Mr. Krainis performed with the group until 1959. In the 1960s he organized and toured with his own ensembles: the Krainis Baroque Trio, the Krainis Baroque Ensemble and the Krainis Consort, becoming one of the few recorder players at the time to have a prominent solo career.

In the early 1970s he was a founding member of Aston Magna, which is still a force in the revival of early music, presenting concerts and sponsoring an important summer music festival at its headquarters in Great Barrington, where Mr. Krainis moved in 1969.

In 1985, at 60, he retired as a performer. But he remained active as a board member and teacher at Aston Magna. He also taught at Kirkland College, Columbia University, the Eastman School of Music and Smith College.

Mr. Krainis is survived by his wife, Betty; a son, John, of Freeport, Me.; a stepson, David H. Lippman of Great Barrington; two stepdaughters, Deborah Morris of Great Barrington and Judith Grant of Chapel Hill, N.C.; a sister, Esther James of Freeland, Wash.; and nine grandchildren.

Though he was a specialist in early music, Mr. Krainis had wide-ranging musical interests. His friend Andrew L. Pincus, the music critic of The Berkshire Eagle, recalled in a recent tribute that Mr. Krainis could frequently be seen at the yearly Tanglewood Festival of Contemporary Music in Lenox, Mass., and that his assessments of new works were insightful. "He had perfect pitch for both quality and cant," Mr. Pincus wrote, "and could be merciless in his judgments of fakery."

References 

American recorder players
1924 births
2000 deaths
20th-century American musicians
20th-century American male musicians
20th-century flautists